James T. Wilde was an English professional footballer who played as a defender.

References

English footballers
Association football defenders
Burnley F.C. players
Reading F.C. players
Accrington Stanley F.C. (1891) players
English Football League players
Year of death missing
Year of birth missing